USS APL-45 is an APL-41-class barracks ship of the United States Navy.

Construction and career
The ship was laid down on 7 February 1945, by the Willamette Iron and Steel Works and launched on 12 May 1945. She was commissioned on 28 July 1945.

She was decommissioned and put into the reserve fleet by January 1947.

The ship undertook the CincPacFlt Berthing and Messing Program, in which she is berthed in Norfolk since at least the early 2000s. She is being used as a berthing and messing barge.

Awards 
American Campaign Medal 
World War II Victory Medal

References

 

 

Barracks ships of the United States Navy
Ships built in Portland, Oregon
1945 ships